Back to the Basics is the eighth mixtape by American hip hop recording artist Rich Homie Quan. It was released on April 14, 2017, by Motown Records. It serves as Quan's first commercial release with Motown.

Singles
The lead single, "Replay" was released on March 17, 2017.

The second single, "Gamble was released on July 31, 2017.

Promotional singles
The promotional single, "Da Streetz" was released on March 31, 2017.

The second promotional single, "Heart Cold" was released on April 7, 2017.

Commercial performance
Back to the Basics debuted at number 74 on the Billboard 200 chart.

Track listing

Charts

References 

Rich Homie Quan albums
Albums produced by Lee Major
Albums produced by Zaytoven
2017 mixtape albums